The Shire of Northern Grampians is a local government area in the Wimmera region of Victoria, Australia, located in the western part of the state. It includes the towns of Stawell, St Arnaud, Great Western, Marnoo, Glenorchy, Stuart Mill, Navarre and the tourist town of Halls Gap. It was formed in 1995 from the amalgamation of the City of Stawell, Town of St Arnaud, Shire of Stawell, Shire of Kara Kara and parts of the Shire of Wimmera, Shire of Dunmunkle and Shire of Donald.

The Shire is governed and administered by the Northern Grampians Shire Council; its seat of local government and administrative centre is located at the council headquarters in Stawell, it also has a service centre located in St Arnaud. The Shire is named after the major geographical feature in the region, The Grampians, and that the northern part of this feature occupies the southern part of the LGA.

The local economy is based on a diverse range of industries including agriculture, tourism, wine production, gold mining, brick manufacturing and meat production.

Council

Current composition
The council is composed of four wards and seven councillors, with three councillors elected to represent the Stawell Ward, two councillors elected to represent the Kara Kara Ward and one councillor per remaining ward elected to represent each of the other wards.

Administration and governance
The council meets in the council chambers at the council headquarters in the Stawell Town Hall Offices, which is also the location of the council's administrative activities. It also provides customer services at both its administrative centre in Stawell, and its service centre in St Arnaud.

Traditional owners 
The traditional owners of the Northern Grampians are the Djab Wurrung, Jardwadjali and Dja Dja Wurrung.

Townships and localities
The 2021 census, the shire had a population of 11,948 up from 11,439 in the 2016 census

^ - Territory divided with another LGA
* - Not noted in 2016 Census

See also
List of localities (Victoria)

References

External links
Northern Grampians Shire Council official website
Metlink local public transport map 
Link to Land Victoria interactive maps

Local government areas of Victoria (Australia)
Grampians (region)
 
Wimmera